The Juvenelle Rosario Skua is a Brazilian mid-wing, T-tailed, single-seat motor glider that was designed and produced by Juvenelle Rosario of Florianópolis. When it was available it was supplied as a complete aircraft.

Design and development
Named for the seabird of the same name, the aircraft is built predominantly from carbon fibre and intended to qualify as a European microlight.

The aircraft is a conventional self-launching sailplane, with a retractable engine. The  span wing mounts dive brakes and holds water ballast. The wings can be folded for storage or ground transportation.

In 2003 production was reported at one per month. At that time two customer aircraft had been completed and three were on order at a price of US$15,000 each.

Specifications (Skua)

See also

References

2000s Brazilian sport aircraft